The Planets are Blasted is the second album by the Boston Spaceships, released in 2009.

Track listing
All songs written by Robert Pollard.

Side A
Canned Food Demons - 2.08
Dorothy's A Planet - 2.21
Tattoo Mission - 2.44
Keep Me Down - 2.40
Big 'O' Gets An Earful - 3.14
Catherine From Mid-October - 1.44
Headache Revolution - 2.22

Side B
Sylph - 2.37
UFO Love Letters - 2.40
Lake Of Fire - 1.56
Queen Of Stormy Weather - 1.53
The Town That's After Me - 1.17
Sight On Sight - 4.06
Heavy Crown - 2.40

Personnel
Robert Pollard - vocals
John Moen - drums, percussion
Chris Slusarenko - guitar, bass, keyboards

References

2009 albums
Boston Spaceships albums